Eleodes armata, the armored stink beetle, is a species of desert stink beetle in the family Tenebrionidae. It is found in the western United States and Mexico in arid environments. It has spurs on all of its legs.

References

Tenebrionoidea
Beetles described in 1851